Chelsea Studios, also known as Chelsea Television Studios, is an American television studio and sound stage located at 221 West 26th Street between Seventh and Eighth Avenues in the Chelsea neighborhood of Manhattan, New York City.

History
The building was originally an armory which was home to the Ninth Mounted Cavalry, which moved to 14th Street in 1914. Adolph Zukor turned it into a studio for the Famous Players Film Company.  Among the films produced there were An American Citizen and That Man from Mexico starring John Barrymore.

In the 1950s, Himan Brown bought the studio and gutted it to create two sound stages known as Production Center Studios. In the 1960s and 70s, Brown leased the facility to CBS for soap opera productions. As of February 2019, it is owned by All Mobile Video.

Films
12 Angry Men (1957)
BUtterfield 8 (1960)
Long Day's Journey Into Night (1962)
You're A Big Boy Now (1967)
The Night They Raided Minsky's (1968)
The Producers (1968)
The Boys in the Band (1970)
The Anderson Tapes (1971)

Source

Television
The Phil Silvers Show
Mama (1956–1957)
Show of the Week (CBS)
The Patty Duke Show
Inner Sanctum
As the World Turns (1965–1967)
Love of Life 
Guiding Light (1968–1988)
Search for Tomorrow (1976–1977)
The Jon Stewart Show (1994–1995)
Ricki Lake (1993–2004)
Where in the World Is Carmen Sandiego (1991)
Judge Hatchett (2000–2008)
The Wendy Williams Show (2008, 2012–2022)
Martha (2005–2012)
The Tyra Banks Show (2007–2010)
Stump the Schwab (2003–2005)
Rachael Ray (2012–2023)
Skavlan
 Sherri (2022–present)

Source

References
Notes

External links
All Mobile Video Chelsea

Television studios in the United States
Recording studios in Manhattan
Chelsea, Manhattan
Entertainment companies based in New York City